Miltonia clowesii, the Clowes' miltonia, is a species of orchid endemic to southeastern Brazil.

References

External links 

clowesii
Endemic orchids of Brazil
Flora of the Atlantic Forest